Alfred Chalke (21 December 1878 – 10 May 1966) was a British fencer. He competed in the individual sabre event at the 1908 Summer Olympics.

References

1878 births
1966 deaths
British male fencers
Olympic fencers of Great Britain
Fencers at the 1908 Summer Olympics